Sopordan or Separdan or Sepordan may refer to:
 Sopordan, Amlash
 Separdan, Siahkal